Lutibacter aestuarii is a Gram-negative, non-spore-forming and non-motile bacterium from the genus of Lutibacter which has been isolated from sediments of tidal flat from the South Sea in Korea.

References

Flavobacteria
Bacteria described in 2012